DNA repair protein XRCC3 is a protein that in humans is encoded by the XRCC3 gene.

Function 

This gene encodes a member of the RecA/Rad51-related protein family that participates in homologous recombination to maintain chromosome stability and repair DNA damage. This gene functionally complements Chinese hamster irs1SF, a repair-deficient mutant that exhibits hypersensitivity to a number of different DNA-damaging agents and is chromosomally unstable. A rare microsatellite polymorphism in this gene is associated with cancer in patients of varying radiosensitivity.

The XRCC3 protein is one of five paralogs of RAD51, including RAD51B (RAD51L1), RAD51C (RAD51L2), RAD51D (RAD51L3), XRCC2 and XRCC3.  They each share about 25% amino acid sequence identity with RAD51 and each other.

The RAD51 paralogs are all required for efficient DNA double-strand break repair by homologous recombination and depletion of any paralog results in significant decreases in homologous recombination frequency.

Two paralogs form a complex designated CX3 (RAD51C-XRCC3).  Four paralogs form a second complex designated BCDX2 (RAD51B-RAD51C-RAD51D-XRCC2).  These two complexes act at two different stages of homologous recombinational DNA repair.

The CX3 complex acts downstream of RAD51, after its recruitment to damage sites.  The CX3 complex associates with Holliday junction resolvase activity, probably in a role of stabilizing gene conversion tracts.

The BCDX2 complex is responsible for RAD51 recruitment or stabilization at damage sites.  The BCDX2 complex appears to act by facilitating the assembly or stability of the RAD51 nucleoprotein filament.

Interactions 

XRCC3 has been shown to interact with RAD51C.

Epigenetic deficiency in cancer

There is an epigenetic cause of XRCC3 deficiency that appears to increase cancer risk.  This is the repression of XRCC3 by over-expression of EZH2 protein.

Increased expression of EZH2 leads to epigenetic repression of RAD51 paralogs, including XRCC3, and thus reduces homologous recombinational repair.  This reduction was proposed to be a cause of breast cancer.  EZH2 is the catalytic subunit of Polycomb Repressor Complex 2 (PRC2) which catalyzes methylation of histone H3 at lysine 27 (H3K27me) and mediates gene silencing of target genes via local chromatin reorganization.  EZH2 protein is up-regulated in numerous cancers.  EZH2 mRNA is up-regulated, on average, 7.5-fold in breast cancer, and between 40% to 75% of breast cancers have over-expressed EZH2 protein.

Interactive pathway map

See also 
 XRCC2

References

Further reading